Guru ka Tal is a historical Sikh pilgrimage place dedicated to the memory of ninth Guru Sri Guru Tegh Bahudar Ji. Guru ka Taal is near Sikandra in Agra. The Gurudwara was built over the place where the Guru Tegh Bahadur offered voluntary arrest to Aurangazeb, the Mughal Emperor. Several devotees gather every year to pay homage to the great Sikh guru ( who was martyred along with his followers for sake of freedom to practice one's faith) in this Gurudwara.

History
This historic structure dates back to the 17th century. Earlier it was a Taal (reservoir) in the area near Sikandra. It was built in 1610 AD to collect and conserve rainwater in Agra during Jehangir reign. The water of the reservoir was used for irrigation purposes during the dry season. The reservoir was ornamented with stone carvings. This is said to be the place where the Guru Tegh Bahadur laid down his arms to offer arrest to Aurangazeb. The Gurudwara called Guru Ka Taal was built in the 1970s due to the contributions and arduous efforts of Sant Baba Sadhu Singhji  "Mauni".

Architecture
There were twelve towers in the Tal, but only eight towers have survived the test of time and have now been retrieved. This red stone structure bears similarity to many other magnificent structures of the Mughals like the Agra Fort, Fatehpur Sikri etc.

See also
Taj Mahal
Agra Fort

External links

Aerial View of Guru Ka Tal
Gurudwara, Guru Ka Tal, Agra
https://web.archive.org/web/20110525061000/http://archnet.org/library/documents/one-document.jsp?document_id=4923
Guru Tegh Bahadur

Mughal architecture
History of Uttar Pradesh
Tourist attractions in Agra district
History of Sikhism
Buildings and structures in Agra